Namdar is an Iranian surname. Notable people with the surname include:

Asieh Namdar, Iranian-American journalist
Cha Cha Namdar, Iranian-American soccer player
Jafar Namdar (1934–2014), Iranian football referee
Masud ibn Namdar, Kurdish-language writer
Bijan Namdar Zangeneh, Iranian politician

Iranian-language surnames